Monkey Barz is the debut solo studio album by American Brooklyn-based rapper Sean Price of Heltah Skeltah. It was released on June 13, 2005 through Duck Down Records as a part of the label's "Triple Threat Campaign", followed by Buckshot's Chemistry and Tek & Steele's Smif 'n' Wessun: Reloaded. The cover art is based on the Planet of the Apes series. Production was handled by Khrysis, TY Deals, Agallah, 9th Wonder, Ayatollah, Dub Z, Edward Maximillion III, Justice, Kleph Dollaz, MoSS, P.F. Cuttin', Phat Babyz, Star.com and Tone Mason, with Buckshot and Drew "Dru-Ha" Friedman serving as executive producers. It features guest appearances from fellow Boot Camp Clik members Buckshot, Louieville Sluggah, Rock, Starang Wondah, Steele, Tek, and affiliate Ruste Juxx.

Despite being charted only at number 70 on the Top R&B/Hip-Hop Albums and number 46 on the Independent Albums in the United States, the album was met with generally favorable reviews. Its lead single, "Boom Bye Yeah", peaked at number 68 on the Hot R&B/Hip-Hop Singles Sales.

Music videos were shot for the songs "Peep My Words", "Onionhead", "Heartburn", "Boom Bye Yeah", "Monkey Barz" and "Slapboxing", which were included on Price's DVD Passion of Price. The album's bonus track "Rising to the Top" was included in the soundtrack to 2001 video game Grand Theft Auto III and can be heard on its fictional radio station Game Radio FM.

Track listing

Notes
Track 9 featured additional vocals by 5ft
Track 16 is listed as bonus track and featured vocals by Bazaar Royale

Charts

References

External links

2005 debut albums
Sean Price albums
Boot Camp Clik albums
Duck Down Music albums
Albums produced by MoSS
Albums produced by Agallah
Albums produced by Khrysis
Albums produced by Ayatollah
Albums produced by 9th Wonder
Albums produced by Tone Mason